Aaron James Murphy is a film and television actor. He was born 1 January 1992 in New Zealand.

Filmography

Film
 Rain (2001) .... Jim
 Boogeyman (2005) .... Young Tim Jensen
 The World's Fastest Indian (2005) .... Tom
 Perfect Creature (2006) .... Slum Kid
 Noise (2007) ... Dead teenage boy
 The off season (2011, Short)
 Stand Up (2011, Short) .... Locker room bully

Television
 Revelations – The Initial Journey
 Episode: "All That Glistens" (2002) .... Billy
 "Power Rangers S.P.D."
 Episode: "Sam: Part 1" (2005) .... Sam (as Aaron James Murphy)
 Episode: "Sam: Part 2' (2005) .... Sam (as Aaron James Murphy)

External links
 
 Entry on TV.com

Living people
1992 births
New Zealand male film actors
New Zealand male television actors